Mongolia competed in the 2009 East Asian Games which were held in Hong Kong, China from December 5, 2009, to December 13, 2009. Mongolia finished eighth on the medal table with 4 silver and 16 bronze medals.

References

2009 East Asian Games
Mongolia at the East Asian Games
2009 in Mongolian sport